The 1903 All England Championships was a badminton tournament held at the London Rifle Brigade Drill Hall in Islington, London, England from 26–28 March 1903.

In the men's singles Ralph Watling of Great Yarmouth successfully defended his title.

Meriel Lucas was unable to defend her singles and doubles titles due to a family illness. The women's singles and doubles consisted of only three rounds following a small number of entries. The women's singles only had five entries and this was attributed to the increase in younger players causing the older women not to enter.

Final results

Men's singles

Women's singles

Men's doubles

Women's doubles

Mixed doubles

References

All England Open Badminton Championships
All England
All England Open Badminton Championships in London
All England Championships
All England Badminton Championships
All England Badminton Championships